Littleton High School is a public high school located at 56 King Street, Littleton, Massachusetts, United States. It serves students in grades 9-12 from the town of Littleton.
The building was opened in 2002. It was formerly located on the site of the current middle school from 1957–2002 on Russell Street. From 1924 to 1957 it was located on Shattuck Street in the building that now houses the town offices and the Reuben Hoar library. From 1957–1968 it was operated as a Junior/Senior high school and again from 1989–2002.

Academics
Littleton High School currently has three levels of classes: College Prep, Honors, and Advanced Placement.

Athletics
The athletic director of Littleton High School is Mike Lynn. Littleton is part of the Midland Wachusett League, which includes schools such as Bromfield, Gardner, and Clinton.

In girls' and boys' rowing, LHS is a co-op with Westford Academy. The rowing team is called Westford-Littleton Crew. In swimming and hockey, LHS is in a co-op with Bromfield.  In girls' ice hockey, LHS is in a co-op with Westford Academy. In gymnastics, LHS is in a co-op with Groton Dunstable and North Middlesex.

On Thanksgiving Day, the Tigers battle Ayer. Prior to Ayer, Littleton's Thanksgiving rival was Westford Academy, and before that, Acton-Boxborough Regional High School. Both of these high schools now play in the DCL (Dual County League).

Fall sports include football, field hockey, boys' and girls' soccer, golf, boys' and girls' cross-country and cheerleading.
Winter sports include ice hockey, boys' and girls' basketball, indoor track, swimming, gymnastics, and cheerleading.
Spring sports include girls' tennis, baseball, softball, track, and boys' and girls' lacrosse.

Littleton High School sports are played in numerous locations. The football team, along with lacrosse, cheerleading and sometimes soccer play at Alumni Field at the Middle School. Baseball, softball, field hockey and soccer play at fields behind the High School. Track meets at the LHS-track for meets, while cross-country runs at Fay Park. The LHS basketball team practices and plays at the gymnasium inside the High School, Boys' and girls' ice hockey play at the Groton School. Tennis, golf and swimming play at numerous locations as well.

The High School Football team went undefeated (13-0) and took home the Division 6 State Championship on December 7, 2013 with a 52-35 win over Cohasset at Gillette Stadium. This is the third time Littleton has been undefeated (previously 1967 and 1968) and the first time ever in Littleton High School history to win a State Championship.

Extra Curricular

Audio/Video Production Club: A group that works with Littleton Community Television founded and created by Mark Crory that lets students learn how to operate new video equipment at the LCTV Studio and create shows to be shown on LCTV channels.  
Band (Concert/Marching/Pep): Students from the LHS Band that play at home football games (pep band) and march in Littleton town parades, while playing three concert per year (concert band).
Chef's Club: Students cook and prepare food. Several dinners are held each year, with everything cooked and set up by the students.
Culture Club:Students have the opportunity to experience other cultures by sampling foods from other cultures, seeing foreign films, going to see art exhibits at local museums, checking out film festivals, and cooking ethnic foods.
Drama Productions: A group of students selects and performs a Musical once a year in the spring, as well as a play in the fall.
Intramurals: Varied sports related activities under the direction of the intramural director. 
Jazz Ensemble: small ensemble that performs jazz pieces; practice is after school and is usually once a week. Two concerts per year, one in spring and one in fall.
Knitting and Crochet Club: Students spend time working on their fiber art crafts. This club meets every week.
Organic Chemistry Club: Students investigate the world of organic chemistry. This club meets twice a week.
Outdoors Club: A club for those interested in nature and who enjoy doing things in the outdoors.
Science Club: An organization for those that are interested in preserving the earth and its environment.
Snowboard/Ski club: A club for those who are interested in or enjoy snowboarding or skiing; participants are given the opportunity to go on after-school skiing & snowboarding trips.
GSA (Gay-Straight Alliance): A group with the purpose of education and creating a place to begin a dialog of acceptance of all people.
Yearbook: A group of students that designs, creates, and edits the high school yearbook. Students can elect this as a class or as a co-curricular activity.
TEAMS: Tests of Engineering Aptitude, Mathematics and Science, is a unique and challenging academic program and competition. The experience is designed to introduce students to an “Engineering Team” work environment. Awards and recognition are possible at the local, state and national levels.
National Honor Society: Membership recognizes students who have demonstrated excellence in the areas of Scholarship, Leadership, Service, and Character. It challenges them to develop further through active involvement in school activities and community service.
Student Council: An organization whose elected officers meet and confer with school officials in order to better the school community.
Roots and Shoots: An organization founded by Jane Goodall, which cleans up school grounds, organizes fundraisers, and helps people, animals, and the world.

References

Schools in Middlesex County, Massachusetts
Public high schools in Massachusetts